Jingpo may refer to:

Jingpo people, also spelled Jingpho, Jinghpaw, Singpho, and Chingp'o
Jingpo language, their language
Jingpo Lake, in Heilongjiang, China